Knitting is a method by which yarn is turned into fabric.

Knit, knitted, or knitting may also refer to:

 Hand knitting
 Knit line, another name for meld line or weld line,  the line where two flow fronts meet
 Knit product, another name for Zappa–Szép product, a mathematical term
 Knitted fabric
 Knitting, bone healing

Film
 Knitting (film), a 2008 Chinese film directed by Yin Lichuan
 The Knitting, a 2012 South Korean short film directed by Yoon Eun-hye

See also
 History of knitting
 List of knitting stitches